In Your Room may refer to:
"In Your Room" (Depeche Mode song) (1993)
"In Your Room" (The Bangles song) (1988)
"In Your Room" (Toni Pearen song) 1992)
In Your Room (Yazoo album) (2008)
In Your Room (Agua de Annique album) (2009)